Raúl Martín (October 9, 1957) is a prelate of the Roman Catholic Church. He served as auxiliary bishop of Buenos Aires from 2006 until 2013, when he became bishop of Santa Rosa.

Life 
Born in Buenos Aires, Martín was ordained to the priesthood on November 17, 1990.

On March 1, 2006, he was appointed auxiliary bishop of Buenos Aires and titular bishop of Troyna. Martín received his episcopal consecration on the following May 20 from Jorge Mario Bergoglio, archbishop of Buenos Aires, the later pope Francis, with bishop of San Martín, Guillermo Rodríguez Melgarejo, and bishop of Gualeguaychú, Jorge Eduardo Lozano, serving as co-consecrators.

He was appointed bishop of Santa Rosa on September 24, 2013.

References

External links 
 catholic-hierarchy.org, Bishop Raúl Martín 

1957 births
21st-century Roman Catholic bishops in Argentina
Living people
Clergy from Buenos Aires
Roman Catholic bishops of Santa Rosa in Argentina
Roman Catholic bishops of Buenos Aires